Robert Evensen (born 28 August 1982) is a Norwegian football defender.

After a stint in Moss FK, where he played in the 2002 Tippeligaen and featured for the Norwegian under-21 team, he joined minnows SK Sprint-Jeløy ahead of the 2004 season. In 2015, he joined Tronvik, but rejoined Sprint on loan in the summer.

He is an electrician by profession.

References

1982 births
Living people
People from Moss, Norway
Norwegian footballers
Moss FK players
Eliteserien players
Norwegian First Division players
Electricians
Association football defenders
SK Sprint-Jeløy players
Sportspeople from Viken (county)